Møbelringen Cup 2010 was a women’s handball tournament, that was played in Tromsø and Bodø in Norway from 26 to 28 November 2010. Norway was the defending champion.

Results

26 November 2010

27 November 2010

28 November 2010

External links 
 About the tournament on NHF's website 
 Results in the 2009 event 
 Results from the tournament

2010 in handball
2010
2010 in Norwegian sport